The cephalic index of a vertebrate is the ratio between the width (side to side) and length (front to back) of its cranium (skull).  This ratio does not concern the muzzle or face, and thus is distinct from the craniofacial ratio, which compares the size of the cranium to the length of the muzzle.  The two measures are often confused in descriptions of dog breeds.

The cephalic index is used to classify animals into three groups:

Brachycephalic (literally 'short-headed'): the length of the cranium is shorter than the width, giving the top and sides of the cranium a round shape, often referred to as 'apple-head'.

Mesaticephalic or mesocephalic ('middle-headed'): the length and width are equal, giving a square shape. When dealing with animals, especially dogs, the more appropriate and commonly used term is not "mesocephalic", but rather "mesaticephalic", which is a ratio of head to nasal cavity.

Dolichocephalic ('long-headed): the length is greater than the width.

Breeds of each group are listed in Cephalic index.

See also 
 Artificial selection
 Brachycephalic airway obstructive syndrome

References 

 Sparks, Corey S.; Jantz, Richard L. (November 2002). A Reassessment of Human Cranial Plasticity: Boas revisited.
 Merriam Webster's New Collegiate Dictionary

Animal anatomy
Biological anthropology